What Remains may refer to:

 What Remains (book), a 2003 photography book by Sally Mann
 What Remains (novella), a 1990 novella by Christa Wolf
 What Remains (TV series), a 2013 British drama series
 ...What Remains, a 1999 album by Spoken
 What Remains: The Life and Work of Sally Mann, a 2005 documentary film about Sally Mann
 What Remains (film), a 2022 American independent film